Saints Cyril and Methodius were brothers from Thessalonica who were Christian missionaries among the Slavs.

Saints Cyril and Methodius may also refer to:

 Order of Saints Cyril and Methodius
 SS. Cyril and Methodius Parish (disambiguation)
 Ss Cyril and Methodius University (disambiguation)
 SS. Cyril and Methodius in Lemont
 Ss. Cyril and Methodius University of Skopje
 SS. Cyril and Methodius National Library
 Ss. Cyril and Methodius Cathedral
 Sts. Cyril and Methodius Church (disambiguation)
 SS. Cyril and Methodius Seminary
 Ss. Cyril and Methodius School
 Church of Saints Cyril and Methodius 
 Byzantine Catholic Seminary of SS. Cyril and Methodius
 Croatian Franciscan Province of Saints Cyril and Methodius